Advances and Applications in Bioinformatics and Chemistry is a peer-reviewed scientific journal covering research in bioinformatics, especially as applied to chemistry, including computational biomodeling, molecular modeling, and systems biology. It was established in 2008 and is published by Dove Medical Press.

External links 
 

English-language journals
Open access journals
Dove Medical Press academic journals
Bioinformatics and computational biology journals